The communications systems of the German armed forces (Bundeswehr) include the strategic communication, information systems for the command and control of combined arms forces. It includes military intelligence, weather forecasting, and aviation of the German armed forces.

For communication, SIGNIT, Electronic Warfare and ELOCAT, Bundeswehr using wired and fiber optic systems, fixed and mobile radio stations and satellite communications. While wired and satellite communication paths are operated using digital methods, HF radio communication is still partly analogue and susceptible to eavesdropping.

History 

The Bundeswehr has used a number of different means of communication since it was founded. Some of the first wireless systems were bought from the US-army. The wired field telephone systems initially used was important in the 1960this and 1970this. It is not used anymore today

In the 2000s, a reorientation of communications technology became clear due to the end of the Cold War and the increase in foreign deployments. The fact that the communication technology is inconsistent and partly outdated became particularly clear during the foreign assignments. Die Zeit wrote in 2018 that when a "paratrooper and his unit wanted to leave the German camp in Kunduz for a patrol, he had more communication electronics than weapons with him."

In the mid-2010s, the Ministry of Defense launched the "Mobile Tactical Communications" (MoTaKo) project to modernize the communication devices for large numbers of troops. New radios were to be developed, built and purchased for 25,000 vehicles and 50,000 soldiers. MoTaKo is one of the Federal Ministry of Defence largest armaments projects of this decade. A total of 5.5 billion euros is planned.

In addition to the police, fire brigade and rescue services, the Bundeswehr also used the digital trunked radio of the so-called "authorities and organizations with security tasks" (BOS) from 2019. The Bundestag passed a corresponding amendment to the law in April 2019. Individual branches of the Bundeswehr were already participants in BOS radio. With the integration into the existing BOS radio, the Bundeswehr saves money for setting up its own radio infrastructure; The federal government will bear the additional annual costs of 8.3 million euros for the Bundeswehr's national BOS radio.

In 2021 Spiegel reported, that the Federal Office for Defense Technology and Procurement (BWB) was having radios from the 1980s replicated for 600 million Euros.Because new devices are not yet ready for use, the Bundeswehr has let the standard radio set of the army, the Thales SEM 80/90 rebuilt again. The radios are still installed in most of Bundeswehr vehicles. The radio was actually developed by the Stuttgart company Standard Elektrik Lorenz AG, which taken over by Thales.

Organisation 

Head of all information-technology and electronic reconnaissance is the Command Cyber and Information Domain Service.

Most of the signal corps (German: Fernmelder) of Bundeswehr are part of the information-technology command of Bundeswehr (Kommando Informationstechnik der Bundeswehr) in the organizational area of "Cyber and Information Domain Service". Around 7.200 soldiers serv in the signal corps.

Army 

Some of the signal corps (German: Fernmelder) are a branch in the German army. Besides this, every Company has its own signal corps specialist within its unit. For long-distance communications for deployments abroad, the HRM-7000 shortwave radio system is often used.

Airforce 
German Air Force (Luftwaffe) has its own signal corps specialist within its units. Beside analog Airband-radios they use the MR6000A SDR from Rohde & Schwarz in Eurofighter and helicopters (Tiger, MH90 and others).

Navy
The German Navy has its own signal corps specialist within its units and at the ships. For on-board communication the Navy will use TETRA standard VHF-radios by Motorola up from 2022. TETRA is also used by German civil rescue and law enforcement agencys.

Tactical networks
 Autoko
Link 16 (NATO)
 Tetra / Tetrapol (VHF based Trans-European Trunked Radio standard)
 VANBw

Systems and equipment

HF communication

Bundeswehr is using the HRM-7000 transceiver of Telefunken / Elbit Systems at deployments abroad. The succedor is HRM-9000. In February 2022 the Bundeswehr (BAAINBw) decided to buy more HRM 7X00 transceivers and the fitting Kryptomodul TCU 7000E for different platforms.

UHF systems 
The main System of Bundeswehr is the SEM 80/90 analog UHF radio, introduced in the early 80this and rebuild in 2021.

At the Afghanistan ISAF deployment of Bundeswehr, platoons often used the US AN/PRC-117. It is a universally-used software defined radio of US Harris Corporation widely used by the US army. It is used for Phone, tactical short messages and data transceiving a wide frequency range. It can also be used to communicate via US military satellites used as relays.
In 2020 Bundeswehr ordered 370 units worth US$30 million. From 2021 until 2024, it planned to order more so that there is a number of 913 radios, worth 91 million euros.

Satellite communication 

SATCOMBw is the Bundeswehr's satellite-based communications system. The system, operated by Airbus Defense and Space, enables the military to make tap-proof telephone calls, video conferences and Internet access worldwide. In the current "Stage 2", which has been in operation since the end of 2011, the system is based on the two communications satellites COMSATBw-1 and 2 with which the ground stations of Bundeswehr and the German Aerospace Center (DLR) is linked. The system has an capacity of 3 × 2 Mbit/s Duplex encrypted.

Mobile Terrestical Data Communication TÜtrSys 

The "Terrestrial Transmission System" (TÜtrSys) is used for data connections between network nodes in the field. The system enables the simultaneous operation of up to three directional radio links.

Radio equipment 
In the 1980s, SEM radios are introduced. SEM means "Sende-Empfänger", German for transceiver.

 SEM 52 SL analog Handhold (introduced in 1995)
 SEM 80/90 analog radio, introduced in the early 80this and rebuild in 2021
 SEM 93E radio for vehicles from Thales (introduced since August 2001)
 HRM-7000 shortwave-radio from Telefunken RACOMS (introduced 1997, 2007 extended by „HRM 7000 Manpack“)
 MR6000A SDR from Rohde & Schwarz (since 2010 in Eurofighter and helicopters)
 PRC-117 from Harris Corporation
 Satcom MK is the satellite-communication System: a 4,6-m-Offset-Antenna on a trailer.
 E-LynX digital military radio equipment from Telefunken Radio Communication Systems GmbH & Co. KG, the German subsidiary of the Israeli Elbit Group.

References

Command and control
Communication Systems of Bundeswehr